The 2013 Spanish Grand Prix (officially the Formula 1 Gran Premio de España 2013) was a Formula One motor race that was held on 12 May 2013 at the Circuit de Catalunya in Montmeló, Spain. The race was the fifth round of the 2013 season, and marked the forty-third running of the Spanish Grand Prix as a round of the Formula One World Championship, and the twenty-third running at Catalunya.

Nico Rosberg took pole position for the race, ahead of his teammate Lewis Hamilton. Fernando Alonso took his thirty-second and most recent Grand Prix victory—and his second in his home race—ahead of Lotus-Renault's Kimi Räikkönen and Ferrari teammate Felipe Massa in third. Pole sitter Nico Rosberg finished sixth overall. The most notable overtaking move came on the first lap as Fernando Alonso went round the outside of both Kimi Räikkönen and Lewis Hamilton going into turn 3. Ferrari's strategy of making 4 pit stops was risky but proved to be the best choice as Alonso was able to beat Räikkönen who did one less to claim victory. It is the latest win in Formula One for Alonso, and it was the last race to be won by a Spanish driver until Carlos Sainz Jr. won the 2022 British Grand Prix, and this was also Ferrari's last win until the 2015 Malaysian Grand Prix.

Classification

Qualifying

 — Felipe Massa was given a three-place grid penalty for blocking Mark Webber.
 — Esteban Gutiérrez was given a three-place grid penalty for blocking Kimi Räikkönen.

Race

Championship standings after the race

Drivers' Championship standings

Constructors' Championship standings

 Note: Only the top five positions are included for both sets of standings.

See also 
 2013 Catalunya GP2 Series round
 2013 Catalunya GP3 Series round

References

External links

Spanish
Spanish Grand Prix
Grand Prix
May 2013 sports events in Europe